Jenefer Blackwell is a Professor of Molecular Parasitology at the Telethon Kids Institute in the University of Western Australia. She studies host susceptibility and resistance to infectious diseases.

Early life and education 
Blackwell went to Methodist Ladies' College, Perth, in 1961. She graduated with First-class honours in Zoology from the University of Western Australia in 1969, and her PhD in 1974. Her dissertation, "The structure of the deme in the frog Crinia insignifera Moore," considered intra-specific divergence in the Western Australian frogs.

Research and career 
Blackwell moved to the UK in 1975 and worked at the London School of Hygiene & Tropical Medicine for 17 years. She was funded by a Wellcome Trust Senior Fellowship until 1991. In 1991 Blackwell joined the University of Cambridge, where she raised money to develop the Cambridge Institute for Medical Research as a GlaxoSmithKline Professor of Molecular Parasitology. She chaired the World Health Organization Leishmania Genome Consortium between 1992 and 2003. Blackwell discovered that cell-mediated immunity is responsible for the genetic risk of visceral leishmaniasis that allows genome-based vaccine development. She contributed to several books and review papers on genomics and leishmaniasis. Her research identified that infections caused by Leishmania donovani, Leishmania major and Leishmania mexicana were determined by genes near the H-11 locus.

She returned to University of Western Australia in 2007, where she established a genetics laboratory at the Telethon Kids Institute. Here she is researching ear infection and metabolic diseases, genome-wide association studies of otitis media in Western Australian children, the use of metabolomics in emerging diseases and aboriginal genetics. She identified the genetic risk factors for high BMI, rheumatic heart disease and Type 2 Diabetes amongst aboriginal communities.

Awards and fellowships 
1994 - British Society for Parasitology Chris Wright Medal

2000 - Leverhulme Medal (Royal Society)

2000 - Elected Fellow of the Academy of Medical Sciences

2009 - Honorary Doctorate from the University of Khartoum

2015 - Elected Fellow of the Australian Academy of Science

2015 - University of Western Australia Vice Chancellor's Senior Research Award

References 

Living people
University of Western Australia alumni
Australian molecular biologists
Fellows of the Australian Academy of Science
Fellows of the Academy of Medical Sciences (United Kingdom)
Year of birth missing (living people)